The 2010–11 season was Trabzonspor's 36th consecutive season in the Süper Lig.

Trabzonspor's primary objective was to regain the Süper Lig title for the first time since 1984. They also aimed to defend their Turkish Cup title, which would allow them to surpass Beşiktaş for second-most Turkish Cups of all time, with nine. Having won the 2009–10 Turkish Cup, the club competed in the 2010 Turkish Super Cup against league champions Bursaspor. Trabzonspor won 3–0 thanks to a hat-trick from forward Teófilo Gutiérrez. Brazilian forward Jackson Coelho, nicknamed Jajá, signed for the club on the same day of the Super Cup.

The club started their domestic league season against Ankaragücü on 15 August 2010, winning 2–0, with both goals coming from Gutiérrez. They also competed in the UEFA Europa League, beginning their campaign against three-time winners Liverpool, and were knocked out after losing 1–3 on aggregate.

Review

Pre-season
It was announced on 25 May 2010 that Trabzonspor would begin their pre-season preparations in Isparta on 27 June. They played their first friendly of the new season on 8 July against Gaziantepspor. The match ended with no goals scored by either team. The club spent thirteen days in Isparta before traveling to Germany on 12 July for nineteen days. The second camp consisted of six friendly matches against FC Wegberg-Beek, F.C. Porto, SC Fortuna Köln, Standard Liège, K.R.C. Genk and Fortuna Sittard. Trabzonspor signed Polish defender Arkadiusz Głowacki for a reported €1 million on 13 June. Before joining the Black Sea club, Głowacki was named the best defender of the Ekstraklasa in 2009. Barış Ataş became the club's third signing of the season when he joined on a free transfer from Diyarbakırspor on 22 June 2010. Ibrahim Yattara was named captain on 26 June following former captain Rigobert Song's departure. Rumours were leaked on 13 July that stated forward Teófilo Gutiérrez was looking to leave the club before their departure to Germany on 12 July. Gutiérrez was unable to obtain a visa when he first transferred to Turkey in January, and had not done so since then. As a result, Gutiérrez was unable to travel with the team to their pre-season camp in Germany, and was instead left in Istanbul. He was expected to join the team on 15 July. The Colombian forward joined the squad on 17 July 2010. The club finished their pre-season preparations with a record of five wins, one draw, and two losses.

August
Because Trabzonspor won the Turkish Cup in 2010, they took part in the Turkish Super Cup. The final took place at Atatürk Olympic Stadium on 7 August against league champions Bursaspor. To commemorate the event, Nike manufactured a special kit. Trabzonspor won the match 3–0, with all three goals coming from Teófilo Gutiérrez. The list of fixtures for the first half of the Süper Lig season were released on 21 July. Trabzonspor started their season on the road against Ankaragücü, before playing their first home match against Fenerbahçe. Trabzonspor opened up the domestic season by defeating Ankaragücü two to nil, with two second half goals from Teófilo Gutiérrez sealing the match. Trabzonspor transferred former FC Schalke 04 youth product Volkan Ünlü from feeder club MVV on 17 August. He was immediately loaned out to Trabzonspor's other feeder club, 1461 Trabzon. Trabzonspor started their European campaign against Liverpool F.C. in the play-off round of the 2010–11 UEFA Europa League on 19 August 2010. The club previously faced the then-English champions in the second round of the 1976–77 European Cup, with Trabzonspor winning the first leg 1–0, but losing the second leg 0–3. Liverpool went on to win the competition. Trabzonspor lost the first leg 0–1 at Anfield. They would go on to lose the second leg 1–2, and were knocked out of the competition by a score of 1–3 on aggregate. Trabzonspor signed A2 defender Mert Ege Özeren to a three-year deal on 23 August following Arkadiusz Głowacki's injury. Trabzonspor played their first derby of the year when they faced Fenerbahçe on 23 August 2010. The Black Sea club struck first in the 14th minute, adding two more goals over a 15-minute span. Fenerbahçe scored two goals, but were unable to score a third in the second half. The win pushed Trabzonspor to the top of the table after two rounds, tied on points with Bursaspor and Kayserispor. The club closed out the month with a love-love draw against Antalyaspor on 30 August. Teófilo Gutiérrez was voted player of the month for August by TrabzonCell subscribers. The prolific goalscorer netted six goals in all competitions for the month of August.

September
The club hit the first international break having played five matches in a 15-day span. A friendly against Giresunspor was organized and played on 4 September. The match finished 2–1 in Trabzonspor's favour, with Engin Baytar and Umut Bulut providing both goals. The club restarted the league season with a 6–1 win over regional rivals Sivasspor. Ibrahim Yattara and Teófilo Gutiérrez bagged a brace each, while Selçuk İnan and Burak Yılmaz filled out the scorers' sheet. Trabzonspor travel once during the month of September to face Kayserispor.

October
Trabzonspor play four matches in the month of October, with two at home and two on the road. They opened up the month against Beşiktaş at home, winning one to nil. Mustafa Yumlu provided the lone goal of the match in his first appearance for the club. The club travel to Istanbul to face Kasımpaşa, before going back home a week later to face Gençlerbirliği. They close the month out in Konya to face Konyaspor on 31 October.

November
The club continue the same schedule of two home and two away matches in November, starting off with a home match against Galatasaray. Trabzonspor will then travel to face league champions Bursaspor, whom they bested earlier in the season with a three to nil win in the 2010 Turkish Super Cup. The club go back home to face Eskişehirspor, before traveling to face Gaziantepspor.

December
Having won the Turkish Cup the previous year, Trabzonspor will begin their quest for a repeat in the group stages of the 2010–11 Turkish Cup. The club is automatically seed first in one of four groups, along with clubs who placed first to third in the league (or first to fourth, if the Turkish Cup winner finishes in the top three). Trabzonspor, along with Bursaspor, Fenerbahçe, and Galatasaray, will be drawn into separate groups and will be joined by sixteen clubs who progress past the play-off round.

Match results

Süper Lig

Turkish Cup

Turkish Super Cup

UEFA Europa League

Friendlies

Tables

Süper Lig

Turkish Cup

Squad statistics

Transfers

In

Total spending:  €5.2 million

Out

Total income:  €0 million
Turnover:  €5.2 million

Loans out

See also
List of Trabzonspor seasons

References

Trabzonspor seasons
Trabzonspor